Burra Katha ( Brain Story) is a 2019 Telugu-language science fiction comedy film, produced by Srikanth Deepala, Kishore and M. V. Kiran Reddy under Deepala Arts & Tough Ened Studios banners and directed by Diamond Ratna Babu. It stars Aadi Saikumar, Mishti Chakraborty and Rajendra Prasad in the lead roles, with music composed by Sai Karthik.

Plot
The film begins with a boy Abhiram, who behaves differently in different situations which causes bewilderment to his father Eeswar Rao (Rajendra Prasad), so he immediately consults a neurosurgeon, Prabhudas (Posani Krishna Murali). Here it is revealed that the boy was born with two brains and holds a dual personality that is triggered by loud noises. Right now, Eeswar Rao raises him as two Abhi / Ram (Aadi Saikumar) dividing and sharing the time. But Abhiram becomes a self-hating person as both the personalities possess contrasting lifestyles. Abhi is a rough, lazy playboy whereas Ram is intelligent and immensely good and wants to dedicate his life to bachelorhood. The story takes a twist when a charming girl Happy (Mishti Chakraborty) enters his life whom Abhi loves but she falls for Ram looking at his humanity. Ahead, Ram too carries a girlfriend, Aascharya (Naira Shah). As a side plot, Abhiram encounters a goon, Gagan Vihari (Abhimanyu Singh) which throws him into a severe life threat. Later love between Abhi and happy becomes intense that they both plan marriage as Abhi tells he will hypnotize Happy's father. The scene changes Abhi's parents in Happy's House for marriage fixation but the father of Happy tells Abhi threatened him by saying marriage should happen because already he spoiled Happy, father of Happy tells him he is ready to fix marriage for Ram and not Abhi and that by surgery in the brain he ready to do surgery free to kill brain of Abhi. The father of Abhi goes sad, in the house, Ram is shown to behave like Abhi's character and went instead of Abhi to threaten the father of Happy to trap Abhi to get killed, Abhi tells all his losses though he was a topper was due to Abhi who is scrap. Abhi hears all these later shown as sad confessing he is scrap drinks with his father.  Now the day of marriage the goon comes for revenge against Ram, now Ram tells he realise why Abhi is important and then awakens Abhi who hits down all the goons and their chief. Happy already confess previously that she loves both Ram and Abhi. Finally, the movie ends in their first-night bedroom scene.

Cast
 Aadi Saikumar as Abhi / Ram (Two Different Brain Personality Disorder)
 Mishti Chakraborty as Happy, love to Abhi
 Naira Shah as Aascharya, love to Ram 
 Rajendra Prasad as Eeswara Rao
 Abhimanyu Singh as Gagan Vihari
 Abhimanyu pandey as jaggi
 Posani Krishna Murali as Neurosurgeon Prabhudas
 Prudhvi Raj as Bongaram Hema
 Fish Venkat 
 Prabhas Sreenu
 Jayasri Rachakonda as Happy's mother
 Chammak Chandra
 Mahesh Achanta
 Geetha Singh
 Mani Chandana
 Gayatri Gupta

Soundtrack 

Music was composed by Sai Karthik. Music was released on ADITYA Music Company.

Production
The film shooting began on 17 August 2018.

Reception
The Hindu declares Burra Katha: It’s a no-brainer by Y. Sunita Chowdary, Five minutes into the story, it becomes obvious that we’re headed for an endless, agonizing experience. The Times of India gives 1/5 rating, saying Burra Katha fails to impress and looks like this is yet another fail for Aadi Saikumar, even if he tries his best to deliver an earnest performance. 123telugu.com provides 2/5 ratings, announcing Burrakatha – Disappointing Drama: The concept is interesting but the narration was no up to the mark. NTV says the film lustily outdated object, writer-turned-director Diamond Ratna Babu fails to tell a quirky storyline in an engaging fashion. The Hans India affirms that the movie doesn't have a solid story that fails to engage the audiences due to a lack of screenplay. Nevertheless, the film begins with an interesting concept and concentrated more on entertainment it is a big letdown.

References 

2019 comedy films
2019 films
Indian science fiction comedy films
2010s Telugu-language films
2010s science fiction comedy films